Telangana Vimochana Samithi is a non-political organisation fighting for the statehood of Telangana. Its founders are V. Prakash and Dileep Kumar.

History
Telangana Vimochana Samithi was formed in June 2009 after V. Prakash and Dileep Kumar broke away from TRS party.

References

Organisations based in Telangana
Telangana movement
2009 establishments in Andhra Pradesh
Organizations established in 2009